Wheezy (born 1992) is an American record producer.

Wheezy may also refer to:

Wheezy, character from the 1999 film Toy Story 2
Wheezy, the codename of version 7 of the Debian Linux operating system

See also
Weezy, a nickname of American rapper Lil Wayne
Weezie, a nickname of All in the Family character Louise Jefferson